Moley Christmas is a video game released in 1987 for the Sinclair Spectrum.  It is the fifth game in the Monty Mole series and  a sequel to the 1987 video game Auf Wiedersehen Monty. It was available exclusively on the cover of Your Sinclair magazine.

Story 
Released as a covertape with Your Sinclair magazine.  Monty is tasked with recovering the source code to his latest game and getting it to the duplication plant.

Gameplay 

Moley Christmas featured similar gameplay to the previous game in the series, Auf Wiedersehen Monty.  The player must guide Monty around various screens, jumping, climbing, dodging enemies, and collecting items.  The game is made up of six screens, which the player must navigate to bring the game from the programmers to the magazine's readers.

History
A competition was run when the game was released. The final screen contained a message to the player. The first person to complete the game and send this message to the Your Sinclair competition address would receive 15 games from the Your Sinclair library.  Six runners-up also received three games each. In a retrospective article from 2003, GamesTM called Moley Christmas an "especially popular" cover game, and further praised it as a "great example" of video game publishers using Christmas to market their games to a wider audience.

References

External links 
 

1987 video games
Action-adventure games
Christmas video games
Gremlin Interactive games
Monty Mole
Video game sequels
ZX Spectrum games
ZX Spectrum-only games
Video games developed in the United Kingdom